Red Salute is a 2006 Malayalam film that was directed by Vinod Vijayan and produced by Milan Jaleel. The film starred Kalabhavan Mani as Chaala Vaasu, an activist and head load worker.

Synopsis
Red Salute follows the character of Chaala Vaasu, a coolie that eventually works his way to the top of the abkari liquor trade business. Despite this bringing him great fortune, Vaasu begins to realize that this fortune comes with its own problems and starts longing for his former life and the simplicity he thinks it brought.

Cast

Reception
IndiaGlitz gave a lukewarm review of Red Salute, calling it "old wine in a new bottle" and that towards the end parts of the film were "sloppy and unimpressive".

References

External links
 

2000s Malayalam-language films
2006 films